Virginia Pérez-Ratton is the pseudonym for Virginia Pérez Johnston (1950–2010). She was a Costa Rican artist, art historian, art critic and curator. She devoted a large part of her life to the promotion of visual arts and the development of artists in Central America and the Caribbean.

Biography 
Virginia Pérez Johnston was born on September 16, 1950 in San José, Costa Rica. Pérez-Ratton obtained her academic degree in French literature at the University of Costa Rica. She got her first artistic study in France from Grace Blanco (drawing), Lola Fernández (painting) and Juan Luis Rodríguez (engraving). In 1987 she went on for a study of Engraving at the École nationale supérieure des arts décoratifs in Paris, and later continued this study in Strasbourg, France.

Since 1994, Pérez-Ratton was the director of the Museum of Contemporary Art and Design in San José. She organized a series of exhibitions of regional artists and stimulated many artistic initiatives. One of these, was her foundation in 1999 of the art center TEOR/éTica, with the goal to promote contemporary art from the region. She organized several conferences and international exhibitions.

In 2002 she was honored with a Prince Claus Award from the Netherlands. The jury described her as a re-inventor of Central America. According to the jury, she "managed to bring together the different artistic terrains of this fragmented and isolated region. With enormous tenacity she introduced artistic environments in and from Central America to each other and to the rest of the world."

In 2009 she received the Magón National Prize for Culture of the Costa Rican Ministry of Culture and Youth. The Magón Prize is the highest cultural award, granted by the Costa Rican State.

The last years of her life, Pérez-Ratton struggled with cancer. The disease turned out to be fatal, she died in her house in Concepción de Tres Ríos, Cartago, Costa Rica on October 6, 2010.

Bibliography (selection) 
 
 1998: Centroamérica Y El Caribe: Una Historia En Blanco Y Negro
2000: Costa Rica En La VII Bienal De La Habana: Cuba, with Alessandro Tosatti 
2001: Bienal Internacional de Pintura, with Adrián Arguedas, Emilia Villegas em Joaquín Rodriguez del Paso, 
2002: Priscilla Monge: Armas Equívocas, with Priscilla Monge
2003: Héctor Burke: Un Desaparecido, with Héctor Burke, 
2003: Liliana Porter: Una "Puesta En Imágenes, with Liliana Porter, 
2004: Iconofagia, with Tamara Díaz
2005: Enfoques A Distancia Sobre La Producción De Cultura En La Situación Contemporánea, with Nikos Papastergiadis en Carlos Capelán, 
2006: Estrecho Dudoso, with Tamara Díaz, 
2007: Rolando Castellón, with Rolando Castellón, Rolando Castellón en Tamara Díaz, 
2009: Lida Abdul, with Lida Abdul, Els van der Plas en Nikos Papastergiadis,

References 

1950 births
2010 deaths
People from San José, Costa Rica
20th-century women artists
Costa Rican artists
Costa Rican women artists
Costa Rican curators
Art critics
Museum directors
Women museum directors
21st-century women artists